Drombus globiceps is one of ten  species of goby in the genus Drombus. It is found in the western Indo-Pacific. Its common names include Kranji drombus and bighead goby. It is a tropical fish and has been recorded from the Ganges Delta and Chilika Lake of India, the Bay of Bengal, Thailand (Kra Isthmus), Singapore, Indonesia, Papua New Guinea, and the Northern Territory and northern Queensland of Australia. It lives in both marine and fresh water environments. It is considered that D. globiceps is possibly a synonym of Drombus ocyurus. Its threats to human is least concerned.

References

External links 
 Drombus globiceps @ fishesofaustralia.net.au

globiceps
Fish of Bangladesh
Fish of Thailand
Fish of Indonesia
Marine fish of Northern Australia
Taxa named by Sunder Lal Hora
Fish described in 1923